King-Bangkok is a female professional volleyball team based in Bangkok, Thailand. The club was founded in 2005 and plays in the Thailand league.

Honours
 Thailand League 
  Champion (1): 2008–09
 Academy League U18 Thailand League
  Champion (1): 2016
  Third (1): 2017

Former names
 Bangkok (2005–2015)
 King-Bangkok (2015– )

Current squad
As of November 2018

Notable players 
Domestic Players

 Pleumjit Thinkaow
 Piyanut Pannoy
 Rattanaporn Sanuanram
 Patcharee Sangmuang
 Sasipaporn Janthawisut
 Sontaya Keawbundit
 Thidarat Pengwichai
 Wiriya Songmuang
 Leelawan Sukkod
 Sirintra Srisuma
 Nittaya Duangpila
 Tanaporn Nusatsung
 Katsara Jittikul
 Thirada Sukwattanapon
 Kannika Krayom
 Sumalai Prasopsuk
 Duenpen Areelue
 Siriporn Sooksen
 Phitchayapak Doklularb
 Nattaporn Seelakhet
 Sumalai Prasopsook
 Kullapa Piampongsan
 Khwanjira Yuttagai
 Nithiwan Malert
 Waraporn Poomjarern
 Anisa Yotpinit
 Natthanicha Jaisaen
 Sineenat Phocharoen

References

Volleyball clubs in Thailand